Creeggan is a surname. Notable people with the surname include:

 Andy Creeggan (born 1971), Canadian musician
 Jim Creeggan (born 1970), Canadian musician